Bertucci's is an American chain of restaurants offering pizza and Italian food. It also offers delivery (from some stores), take-out and private dining. Bertucci's was founded by Joey Crugnale in Davis Square, Somerville, Massachusetts, in 1981. The company expanded rapidly during the 1990s. Bertucci's locations are primarily found in the Northeast US, but range as far south as Virginia. N.E. Restaurant Co. Inc. bought out Bertucci's in 1998, adopting the Bertucci's Co. name in 2001.

History 
Joseph ("Joey") Crugnale, Bertucci's founder, was born in Sulmona, Italy. He landed his first job in a restaurant while in high school, after emigrating to Boston, Massachusetts. He worked as a porter at the Sonesta Hotel in Cambridge, Massachusetts. In 1974, he opened his first ice cream stand. In 1975, he refinanced his father's home and purchased Steve's Ice Cream from founder Steve Herrell for $80,000. Crugnale established 26 stores before selling the concept to Integrated Resources in 1983 for $4.5 million.

The first 'Bertucci's Pizza and Bocce' was opened in 1981, two doors from Steve's Ice Cream in Davis Square. Bertucci's was opened to eliminate the possibility of an ice cream competitor moving in. The name was found in a magazine during a flight to New York City. The original location had a bocce court in the basement.

1980s 
Two more Massachusetts restaurants opened in 1985, in Cambridge and Holliston, MA. They featured open-hearth brick oven specialty pizzas topped with ingredients such as artichoke hearts and roasted eggplant. The fourth restaurant opened in Brookline Village during the Spring of 1986 and featured a Bocci Court. No two Bertucci's were alike to avoid marketing as a chain. It planned to operate 20 restaurants by 1990.

While the company grew it spent less than 1 percent of revenues on advertising, relying on word of mouth. USA Today listed Bertucci's as one of America's top 10 pizza restaurants in 1989; by then, its headquarters were in Woburn, Massachusetts.

1990s
In the 1990s Bertucci's menu added soups, salads, and pasta dishes before expanding into Rhode Island and New Hampshire.

Bertucci's became a publicly owned company in July 1991. The company offered 21 units for $13 per share. That year sales increased 30 percent to $37.4 million and net income increased by 90 percent to $3 million. Stock prices nearly doubled, selling for $24.75 per share.

In 1992 delivery and take-out services were added; Bertucci's grew from 26 to 36 stores. In 1994, it expanded to Atlanta, Georgia; Chicago; Orlando, Florida; and New Jersey. Bertucci's had 63 stores by 1995.

Joey Crugnale attempted to take the chain private again in 1998, but though the board approved his attempt, he was outbid. N.E. Restaurant Co. Inc. purchased Bertucci's for $10.50 a share during the buyout.

2000s 
In 2001, N.E. Restaurant Co. Inc. sold its Chili's and On the Border restaurants to Brinker International, and changed its name to Bertucci's Corp. A $4 million advertising tagline "Everybody Eats" was developed in April 2002.
In 2006, Italian chain Vinny T's rebranded as Buca di Beppo and withdrew from some markets. As part of their consolidation, they sold 11 Boston locations to Bertucci's Corp. By the end of the decade the chain had nearly 100 locations.

2010s

In 2011, The Boston Globe did a DNA investigation of fish available in area restaurants and supermarkets and determined that 50% of the fish was not properly labeled as to species. Bertucci's was asked for comment, and acted swiftly to correct the issue – an article on their search to find an acceptable serving of cod to replace the hake that their supplier had sourced them with appeared at the same time as the report on the investigation.

On December 3, 2012, Bertucci's opened its first 2Ovens concept restaurant in the re-vamped White City shopping center in Shrewsbury, Massachusetts. The brick ovens are the primary method of cooking in the restaurant.

On April 15, 2018, Bertucci's filed for Chapter 11 bankruptcy. The chain is expected to close about half of their locations and the plans are to hold an auction for the remainder of the company. The opening bid would be for $19.7 million and if no higher bid come is made, an affiliate of Right Lane Capital has agreed to purchase the chain. The company owes approximately $9 million to their suppliers and $110 million to financial lenders.

In June 2018, the Bertucci's chain agreed to be acquired by the corporate parent of Planet Hollywood, Earl Enterprises, for $20 million.

2020s
On December 5, 2022, Bertucci's once again filed for Chapter 11 bankruptcy, and closed even more restaurants.

See also

 List of Italian restaurants
 List of pizza chains of the United States

References

External links
 

1981 establishments in Massachusetts
American companies established in 1981
Companies that filed for Chapter 11 bankruptcy in 2018
Companies that filed for Chapter 11 bankruptcy in 2022
Economy of the Northeastern United States
Italian restaurants in the United States
Italian-American culture in Rhode Island
Pizza chains of the United States
Regional restaurant chains in the United States
Restaurants established in 1981
Restaurants in Massachusetts